Gigas Sulci is an area of subparallel furrows and ridges in the Tharsis quadrangle of Mars, located at .  It is 398 km across and was named after a classical albedo feature name.  The term "sulci" is applied to subparallel furrows and ridges.

References 

Tharsis quadrangle
Ridges on Mars